Euphrasia collina is a perennial herb or subshrub in  the genus Euphrasia. Plants grow to between 5 and 60 cm high and have leaves with 1 to 6 teeth per side. The flowers may be white, blue, pink or purple, sometimes blotched with yellow on the lower petal.

It occurs in South Australia, Victoria, Tasmania and New South Wales in a wide variety of habitats including woodland, heath and grasslands, from coastal to alpine areas.

Taxonomy
The species was first formerly described by botanist Robert Brown
in Prodromus Florae Novae Hollandiae in 1810. There are a number of subspecies currently recognised:

Euphrasia collina R.Br. subsp. collina 
Euphrasia collina subsp. diemenica (Spreng.) W.R.Barker 
Euphrasia collina subsp. diversicolor W.R.Barker 
Euphrasia collina subsp. glacialis (Wettst.) W.R.Barker 
Euphrasia collina subsp. gunnii (Du Rietz) W.R.Barker 
Euphrasia collina subsp. lapidosa W.R.Barker  
Euphrasia collina subsp. muelleri (Wettst.) W.R.Barker 
Euphrasia collina subsp. nandewarensis W.R.Barker  
Euphrasia collina subsp. osbornii W.R.Barker 
Euphrasia collina subsp. paludosa (R.Br.) W.R.Barker 
Euphrasia collina subsp. speciosa (R.Br.) W.R.Barker  
Euphrasia collina subsp. tetragona (R.Br.) W.R.Barker 
Euphrasia collina subsp. trichocalycina (Gand.) W.R.Barker

References

collina
Lamiales of Australia
Flora of New South Wales
Flora of South Australia
Flora of Victoria (Australia)
Flora of Tasmania
Plants described in 1810